Václav Brdek (13 September 1913 – 1973) was a Czech wrestler. He competed in the men's freestyle lightweight at the 1936 Summer Olympics.

References

1913 births
1973 deaths
Czech male sport wrestlers
Olympic wrestlers of Czechoslovakia
Wrestlers at the 1936 Summer Olympics
Place of birth missing